Non-binary (also spelled nonbinary) or genderqueer is a spectrum of gender identities that are not exclusively masculine or feminineidentities that are outside the gender binary. Non-binary identities can fall under the transgender umbrella, since many non-binary people identify with a gender that is different from their assigned sex. Another term for non-binary is enby (from the abbreviation 'NB'). This page examines non-binary characters in fictional works as a whole, focusing on characters and tropes in cinema and fantasy.

For more information about fictional characters in other parts of the LGBTQ community, see the corresponding pages about pansexual, intersex, and gay characters in fiction.

Non-binary characters and tropes

Much like with gay and transgender characters, representation of non-binary characters is small. Eighty percent of non-binary people noted in a survey from Trans Media Watch that they felt media coverage of non-binary characters is poor. The Daily Dot has noted that in Japanese media, genderqueer identities are often portrayed as a joke, featuring "flamboyantly gay people who crossdress" rather than serious explorations of gender performance. However, in May 2015, Flavorwire stated that genderqueer characters are getting "increasing critical and aesthetic prominence" in literature.

Steven Universe and beyond
Some franchises alleviated that concern. For instance, the Steven Universe franchise, from 2013 to 2020, included various non-binary characters. For instance, Obsidian, a fusion of Steven Universe and fellow Crystal Gems Garnet, Amethyst, and Pearl, and Rainbow Quartz 2.0, a fusion of Steven Universe and fellow Crystal Gem Pearl, were confirmed as non-binary by storyboarders Colin Howard and Joe Johnston. Additionally, Smoky Quartz, a fusion of Steven Universe and fellow Crystal Gem Amethyst, is nonbinary since, as series creator Rebecca Sugar stated, the Gems are "all non-binary women," which applies to Amethyst specifically. Furthermore, Sunstone, a fusion of Steven Universe and fellow Crystal Gem Garnet, uses singular they and feminine pronouns and Shep is non-binary. Shep is the first character in the series to be a non-binary human, is the partner of Sadie Miller. Shep is voiced by Indya Moore who is also non-binary, transgender, uses gender neutral they/them pronouns, and is a person of color. Another character is Stevonnie, who is a fusion of Steven and Connie. Steven and Connie identify as male and female respectively, but the gender of Stevonnie is difficult to describe, with series creator Rebecca Sugar describing it as the "living relationship between Steven and Connie." Stevonnie is commonly referred to with gender neutral pronouns (such as the singular they), while male and female characters seem to be physically attracted to Stevonnie.

Steven Universe is only one of the many animated series with characters that identify outside the gender binary. One of the first characters was Princess Sapphire in Princess Knight. Sapphire was raised as a boy by her father since women are not eligible to inherit the throne; this storyline has led some reviewers to interpret her as genderqueer. Many years later, in 2003, Kino's Journey, featured another character outside the binary as well. In this series, the protagonist, Kino, was assigned female at birth, but has an "androgynous persona," alternating between using feminine and masculine pronouns, while resisting those that attempt to pin a gender on them as a "girl" or "boy." This led some reviewers to call Kino one of the "rare transmasculine anime protagonists." One year afterward, bro'Town began. In this show, Brother Ken is fa'afafine, a Samoan concept for a third gender, a person who is born biologically male but is raised and sees themself as female A few years later, in 2009, Kämpfer featured a genderqueer character. Natsuru Senō is a second-year student at Seitetsu High School and has a crush on Kaede Sakura, one of the school's beauties. Apart from Sapphire, Kino, and Natsuru, there is Violet Harper/Halo in Young Justice. Halo is genderqueer, not identifying as male or female In 2011, Nathan Seymour / Fire Emblem was a character in Tiger & Bunny. Nathan is a highly effeminate homosexual man who identifies as genderqueer though he prefers to be identified as a woman at times, often spending more time with the female heroes while flirting with the male heroes. A few years later, from 2014 to 2015, Knights of Sidonia featured another character outside the binary. Izana Shinatose belongs to a new, nonbinary third gender that originated during the hundreds of years of human emigration into space. Wren in Middle School Moguls who is non-binary. In 2017, Milo in Danger & Eggs, an agender character, who uses they/them pronouns, first appeared. Milo later forms a band with the show's protagonists, DD Danger and Philip, named the Buck Buck Trio and play a music festival together. Tyler Ford, an agender model and speaker is the voice of Milo, said they loved that their character, is an "accurate representation" of them. Finally, in 2019, Stars Align featured Yū Asuka, a character who is not sure of whether they are "binary trans, x-gender, or something else entirely" and is still figuring their gender identity.

Other series and films
While animation has various characters outside the gender binary, there are some in other mediums. One of the first was Krazy Kat, in the comic of the same name, alternates pronouns, which was syndicated from 1913 to 1944. Author George Herriman left Krazy ungendered, describing the character in private correspondence as "something like a sprite, an elf" with "no sex". In another first, in 1976, the novel Two Strand River included Alan / Leslie, a genderfluid character, making it one of the earliest literary novels to star a genderfluid character. Following this was Desire in The Sandman, which ran from 1989 to 2015. In this comic, Desire is both male and female, because the character represents everything someone might desire, Many years later, in 2010, the novel Annabel included a genderfluid character. In that novel Annabel / Wayne is born intersex and assigned male at birth, sometimes taking on the name "Annabel". In 2015, Magnus Chase & the Gods of Asgard featured Alex Fierro, who was described as transgender and genderfluid. Then, in 2019, Jerico Soberanis appeared in The Toll, as a genderfluid character who goes by he/him or she/her based on the presence of the sun and moon.

While All in the 2016 film, Zoolander 2, was criticized as "an over-the-top, cartoonish mockery of androgyne/trans/non-binary individuals," there were other positive examples in film. One of the earliest was Little Horse in Little Big Man, a Two-Spirit character. A number of films in the 2010s featured characters ourside the binary. In the 2017 film, They, J is a trans teen on puberty blockers that needs to decide their gender before meeting with a doctor, with J saying they feel male, female, or neither at various times. The actor, Fehrenbacher, was also undergoing gender transition at the time of filming. In a film the following year, Upgrade, Jamie is a hacker not identifying with any of the genders, requesting that the protagonist not ask their gender, Then, in the 2019 Hollywood blockbuster, John Wick: Chapter 3 – Parabellum, there is a character named The Adjudicator. This character does not have a specified gender in the script since Asia Kate Dillon, a nonbinary person, came up with the idea of making their character nonbinary while talking with the director.

Live-action television series included various characters outside the gender binary. For instance, Sam Malloy in the 2007–2008 series, The Riches, is transgender and frequently dresses in feminine clothing. The idea for Sam's non-binary gender expression came about before Izzard, a gender non-conforming comedian, joined the show. Sam's gender expression is accepted and respected by the Malloy parents and siblings. Additionally, Janet in the 2016–2020 series, The Good Place, is a non-human, genderless entity who uses she/her pronouns, which corrects other characters who attempt to gender her by saying she is "not a girl". Another series that began the same year, Degrassi: Next Class featured a similar character. Yael Baron is genderqueer and uses singular they/them pronouns. Also that year, The Switch featured Zoey, a feisty "transgender genderqueer" woman who is guarded by her neighbor, Detective Sandra McKay, a cisgender lesbian. In 2019, Good Omens and Nightflyers premiered and both featured non-binary characters. In the first show, Crowley and Pollution are non-binary, as is Azeriphale in the original book. In the second show, Lommie Thorne is a genderfluid cyber technician specialist who prefers to interface with computers more than humans. The same year, the ongoing series Good Trouble included a non-binary character. Joey Riverton comes out as nonbinary to their cisgender lesbian girlfriend, Alice, and begins using they/them pronouns, Lindsay Brady in the same show is also non-binary. The 2020s brought various non-binary characters. For example, Bishop in Deputy is considered the first non-binary character on broadcast television. Additionally, there is Ripley Lennox in Hollyoaks. They run a shop for second-hand clothes and befriends some of the show's younger characters like Peri Lomax and Romeo Quinn, while she is a friend of Tom Cunningham, a regular character, and are non-binary.

There's also a number of characters which some have considered non-binary such as Chick the Cherub in John Dough and the Cherub, Zoë Hange in Attack on Titan, K1-B0 in Danganronpa, Glen/Glenda Ray in Seed of Chucky, and Pat in Saturday Night Live, although there is no agreement they are non-binary. The same applies to Twogami / Imposter in Danganronpa, Master Chief in Halo (franchise), Nights and Reala in Nights into Dreams, and The Knight in Hollow Knight.

The 2018 manga Love Me for Who I Am features a nonbinary protagonist, Mogumo, who explicitly tells other characters that they are neither male nor female.

Prominent examples
Apart from the above-listed examples, there are some other characters that stand out apart from the rest. For instance, like Pythio in Head Over Heels is non-binary, Musidorus in the same play comes out by saying that they are both a son and daughter to their mother-in-law, May in & Juliet is defined as a character who is "not [confined] to any bracket of gender." and Oscar François de Jarjayes in The Rose of Versailles is genderqueer.

Animation has led the way when it comes to representation. Angel in the ongoing all-ages animation, Craig of the Creek is agender, and uses they/them pronouns. They are voiced by Angel Lorenzana who is a storyboard artist and writer for the show, who identifies as agender and uses the same pronouns. In later tweets, they added that their "cartoon self" used they/them before themselves, gave a shoutout to the show's crew, and said that while this is a small contribution to LGBT representation, they hope "fans can take comfort knowing that there's also non-binary people working behind the scenes" on every of the show's episodes. Additionally, Asher in the 2020 young adult animation, Kipo and the Age of Wonderbeasts is non-binary and uses they/them pronouns, which was later confirmed by Bill Wolkoff, co-screenwriter of Kipo. Another animation which ended in 2020 included a non-binary character: She-Ra and the Princesses of Power. In that series, Double Trouble was described by series creator ND Stevenson as a "nonbinary shapeshifting mercenary". They are voiced by Jacob Tobia, a non-binary person. The ongoing series
The Dragon Prince and Gen:Lock both feature non-binary characters. In the first show, Kazi in The Dragon Prince, the Sunfire Elf sign language interpreter, goes by they/them pronouns. In the second show, Val/entina is genderfluid.

In literature, there are a few examples that stand out. In 2013, the novel On Steel Breeze featured a non-binary character. Travertine in the novel uses "ve/ver" pronouns, and there is no mention of it being unusual in the book. The same year, the film The Kings of Summer included an agender character. In the film, Biaggio states that he does not see himself as having a gender. In the 2015-2017 novel series, Star Wars: Aftermath, Eleodie Maracavanya appeared. Eleodie is a pirate ruler referred to by either male, female or gender-neutral pronouns like "zhe" or "zher". In 2016, Symptoms of Being Human featured a character outside the gender binary as well. Riley Cavanaugh writes a viral blog about being genderfluid, and struggles to come out to parents and friends, using they/them pronouns often. The following year, The Carmilla Movie had a non-binary character. S. LaFontaine, in this movie, uses singular they/them pronouns.

Literature and animation are not the only media which includes such character. The podcast Critical Role, running from 2015 to present, features Bryce Feelid, a character who is non-binary and uses they/them pronouns. A year following that, the live-action series, The Switch began. In this show, Chris uses "zie/zir" pronouns. The year after, Miss Bruce was introduced in the series, Star. Bruce is a fierce genderfluid person who became a fan favorite for those who watched the show. Also that year One Day at a Time began. One character, Syd, uses singular they/them pronouns. and is the 'syd'nificant other of Elena Maria Alvarez Riera Calderón Leyte-Vidal Inclán. The latter is an activist and feminist teenage daughter of Penelope who later discovers that she is lesbian and comes out to her family. Most recently, is Adira Tal in Star Trek: Discovery. They are the first non-binary character in the Star Trek Universe, a highly intelligent character on the USS Discovery, and unexpectedly becomes friends with Lt. Commander Paul Stamets and Dr. Hugh Culber. Adira is also an introvert who does not originally tell the crew they are non-binary, using "she/her" pronouns until episode 8 when Adira comes out as non-binary and asks to be referred to as "they or them."

Literature, animation, podcasts, and TV shows are only some of the places where non-binary characters have appeared. The film and musical of the same name, 
Hedwig and the Angry Inch featured a genderqueer character named Hedwig Robinson. The creator of both described Hedwig as 
"more than a woman or a man. She's a gender of one." Webcomics have featured numerous non-binary characters. In The Order of the Stick, which began in 2003 and continues to the present day, Vaarsuvius has a deliberately ambiguous gender. Berlew states in the commentary of the series fifth book that the Vaarsuvius is genderqueer and has no intentions to further elaborate. Similarly, Angel in the webcomics Ménage à 3 and Sticky Dilly Buns, which ran from 2008 to 2019 and 2013–2019 respectfully, is a genderfluid character. Angel was assigned female, alternating between presenting as male and female, and first appeared in 2013. On a similar note, there is Eth in Eth's Skin, which has run from 2014 to the present. Eth uses singular they/them pronouns in the webcomic, with author Sfé Monster stating that Eth presents and identifies as gender-neutral. Video games like Crypt of the NecroDancer and Wandersong have also included non-binary characters as well. For the first game, published in 2015, Bolt is genderqueer, meaning they do not identity "fully as either male or female," according to Ted Martens, the artist of this video game. In the case of the second game, published in 2018, The Bard is referred to with singular they/them pronouns, but it is also mentioned that any pronouns are fine for them in a QA session. Finally, there is Nine in a serialized speculative fiction multimedia narrative titled 17776, a fictional depiction of the Pioneer 9 space probe, is a non-binary character.

Notes

See also 

 List of fictional non-binary characters
Discrimination against non-binary people
 Third gender
 Non-binary gender
 Legal recognition of non-binary gender
 List of animated series with LGBT characters
 List of fictional polyamorous characters
 Media portrayal of asexuality
 Lists of LGBT figures in fiction and myth

References

External links
 What is “non-binary”? Learn from our favorite TV characters, Film Daily, March 26, 2020
 Some of our most beloved fictional characters break free from the gender binary!, Pride.com, May 6, 2020
 The Evolution of Representation for Trans and Gender Nonconforming Characters, CBR, November 20, 2020

 
Non-binary gender
LGBT fiction